Halifax power station supplied electricity to the town of Halifax and the wider area from 1894 to the 1960s. It was owned and operated by Halifax Corporation until the nationalisation of the electricity supply industry in 1948. The power station was redeveloped several times and at its peak had a generating capacity of 48 MW.

History
In 1892 Halifax Corporation applied for a Provisional Order under the Electric Lighting Acts to generate and supply electricity to the town. This was granted by the Board of Trade and was confirmed by Parliament through the Electric Lighting Orders Confirmation (No. 2) Act 1892 (45 & 46 Vict. c. xxxvii). The power station was built in Foundry Street Halifax 53°43'34"N 1°51'28"W) and first supplied electricity in December 1894. In the previous year the Halifax municipal refuse destructor was the first in Britain to generate electricity from refuse. This comprised a Livet steam generator driving a Parsons turbo-alternator with a capacity of 25,000 candle power (about 355 kW).

Equipment specification
The original plant at Halifax power station comprised vertical and horizontal engines coupled directly and by ropes to ECC alternators. In 1898 the generating capacity was 600 kW and the maximum load was 295 kW.

Plant in 1920s
New plant was installed to meet growing demand for electricity. By 1923 the generating plant comprised:

Coal-fired boilers generating up to 235,000 lb/h (29.6 kg/s) of steam, these supplied steam to:

 Generators:
 1 × 700 kW reciprocating engine driving a direct current generator
 1 × 1,500 kW steam turbo-alternator, 6.6 kV
 1 × 3,500 kW steam turbo-alternator, 6.6 kV
 1 × 6,000 kW steam turbo-alternator, 6.6 kV
 1 × 10,000 kW steam turbo-alternator, 6.6kV

These machines gave a total generating capacity of 21,000 kW of alternating current and 700 kW DC.

A variety of electricity supplies were available to consumers:

 3-phase, 50 Hz AC at 400 & 230 Volts
 DC 460 & 230 Volts

Plant in 1955
New plant was commissioned as older plant was retired. By the 1950s Halifax power station comprised: 

 Boilers:
 2 × Babcock & Wilcox boilers with chain grate stokers, each 100,000 lb/h (12.6 kg/s), steam conditions 370 psi and750°F (25.5 bar, 399°C)
 2 × Babcock & Wilcox boilers with chain grate stokers, each 110,000 lb/h (13.86 kg/s), steam conditions 370 psi and750°F (25.5 bar, 399°C)

The boilers had a total evaporative capacity of 420,000 lb/h (52.9 kg/s), and supplied steam to:

 Turbo-alternators:
 1 × British Thomson-Houston - Curtis 10 MW turbo-alternator, operating at 200 psi and 640°F (13.79 bar and 338°C)
 1 × British Thomson-Houston - Curtis 12 MW turbo-alternator, operating at 350 psi and 750/775°F (24.1 bar and 399/413°C)
 1 × British Thomson-Houston - Curtis 7.8 MW turbo-alternator, operating at 350 psi and 750/775°F (24.1 bar and 399/413°C)
 1 × Brush-Ljungstrom 18.5 MW turbo-alternator, operating at 350 psi and 750/775°F (24.1 bar and 399/413°C)

The total installed generating capacity was 48.3 MW, with an output capacity of 37 MW.

Condenser cooling water was cooled in six 2.9 million gallons per hour (3.66 m3/s) wooden cooling towers.

Operations
In 1898 maximum electricity demand was 295 kW. There was the equivalent of 20,800 8-candle power lamps on the system. There were 26 public lamps. The station delivered 218,707 kWh of electricity to 305 customers. 

In 1920s there was a deep distrust between the municipal electricity undertaking such as Halifax and Huddersfield and the Yorkshire Power Company. The Halifax and Huddersfield electricity undertakings laid, at considerable expense, an underground cable between their systems. This was despite the fact that there was an existing overhead line operated by the Yorkshire Power Company. And that the power company would have supplied electricity below the cost that the undertakings could generate electricity.

Operating data 1921–23
The operating data for the period 1921–23 is shown in the table:

The growth of demand and use of electricity is evident.

Under the terms of the Electricity (Supply) Act 1926 (16-17 Geo. 5 c. 51) the Central Electricity Board (CEB) was established in 1926. The CEB identified high efficiency 'selected' power stations that would supply electricity most effectively; Halifax was designated a selected station. The CEB also constructed the national grid (1927–33) to connect power stations within a region.

Operating data 1946
Halifax power station operating data  for 1946 is given below:

The British electricity supply industry was nationalised in 1948 under the provisions of the Electricity Act 1947 (10-11 Geo. 6 c. 54). The Halifax electricity undertaking was abolished, ownership of Halifax power station was vested in the British Electricity Authority, and subsequently the Central Electricity Authority and the Central Electricity Generating Board (CEGB). At the same time the electricity distribution and sales responsibilities of the Halifax electricity undertaking were transferred to the Yorkshire Electricity Board (YEB).

Operating data 1954–67
Operating data for the period 1954–67 is shown in the table:

Closure
Halifax power station was decommissioned in the late 1960s. The buildings were subsequently demolished and the area has been redeveloped with industrial and commercial units. However, the location is still the site of Halifax 132 kV substation.

See also
 Timeline of the UK electricity supply industry
 List of power stations in England

References

Coal-fired power stations in England
Demolished power stations in the United Kingdom
Former power stations in England
Buildings and structures in Halifax, West Yorkshire